The Crucible is a nonprofit industrial arts school in Oakland, California, United States. Established in Berkeley in 1999, the institute was moved to its present location in 2003.

The Crucible has classes in blacksmithing, ceramics, enameling, fire performance, foundry, glass, hot wheels, jewelry, kinetics and electronics, machine shop, moldmaking, neon and light, stone working, textiles, welding, woodworking, and other industrial arts with an average of 5,000 students a year.  The Crucible's Youth Program serves over 3,000 youth annually, half of whom are members of the West Oakland community who have access to free classes and workshops. Founder, Michael Sturtz, has created two fire operas, a fire ballet, and a burning version of Homer's Odyssey, in addition to the annual Fire Arts Festival  held in July.

As a nonprofit organization, The Crucible relies on annual membership donations, grants and individual donations.

Youth & Community program
The Crucible Youth Program is committed to community service with local schools and neighborhoods. Since 2005, the Youth and Community Outreach Program has served nearly 8,000 youth between the ages of 8 and 18.

The program includes weekend and afterschool classes, camps, and field trips. The experiences support learning in areas such as mathematics, science, art, and world culture. Participants learn about the processes, tools, materials and applications of industrial arts.

Earn-A-Bike program
The workshop gives West Oakland youth hands on experience to learn about bike mechanics. In a six-week workshop, the youth work with volunteer bike mechanics to fix donated bikes. Each participant fixes two bikes and keeps one. The other bike is sold to raise money to support the bike program.

The Crucible holds 'Bike Fix-a-thon' workshops where youth and their families can learn about bike maintenance and safety.

Educational Response Vehicle (ERV)
The Crucible's Educational Response Vehicle (ERV) is a 1960 International Harvester fire engine, modified to a demonstration platform for industrial and fire arts. ERV can demonstrate:
Blacksmithing
Arc Welding
Oxy-acetylene torch cutting
Glass Flameworking

Events

Fire Arts Festival 

The Fire Arts Festival is a fundraising event, and proceeds benefit The Crucible's arts education programs for youth and adults.

Fire Operas and Fire Ballets
The Crucible has staged full-length performances of the following shows:
 Jan 2009: Dracul, Prince of Fire
 April 2008:  Firebird: "L'oiseau de feu"
 Jan 2007:  Romeo and Juliet
 Jan 2006:  Seven Deadly Sins
 Jan 2004:  DidoO and Aeneas by Henry Purcell

Fashion shows
The Crucible has put on fashion shows:
 Jan 2008: Hot Couture - a fusion of fire and fashion
 April 2007: Industrial Chic - fashion and art show

Studio access with the CREATE program
CREATE stands for the Crucible's Expanded Access to Tools & Equipment. The Crucible offers the opportunity to use their tools and equipment through the CREATE program. After passing studio area check-outs, current and past students can use The Crucible's tools and equipment during  studio hours.

Corporate teambuilding

Die Moto
Die Moto is a custom-built performance diesel motorcycle that has set the world speed record for diesel motorcycles at 130.614 mph. Capable of running on diesel, biodiesel, or straight vegetable oil (SVO) fuels, Die Moto was designed and fabricated at The Crucible by a team of vehicle enthusiasts, engineers and artisans. The Die Moto team wanted to prove the viability of alternative fuel technology in performance vehicles. The motorcycle's emissions are 78% less than a standard diesel engine at speeds over 130 mph. As fuel efficiency and low emissions become increasingly important, diesel technology has responded with improved mileage and easy adaptation to biodiesel and SVO. The team of volunteers, known as The Diesel Dozen, crafted Die Moto from BMW R1150RT motorcycle parts, replacing the motor with a high performance BMW automotive diesel engine found only in Europe.

References

External links
Reviews of The Crucible at Yelp

Culture of Oakland, California
Education in Oakland, California
Buildings and structures in Oakland, California
Tourist attractions in Oakland, California
Art in the San Francisco Bay Area